Paradise City station ( Paladaiseusiti Yeok)  is a station of the Incheon Airport Maglev in Unseo-dong, Jung District, Incheon, South Korea. It was formerly known as International Business Center station.

Metro stations in Incheon
Jung District, Incheon
Railway stations opened in 2016
2016 establishments in South Korea
Incheon Airport Maglev